The South Fork Burnt River is a tributary of the Burnt River in Baker County in the U.S. state of Oregon. Its headwaters lie in the Monument Rock Wilderness and the Wallowa–Whitman National Forest of the Blue Mountains. It flows generally northeast for about to meet the main stem at Unity Reservoir, north of Unity.

Recreation
The spring-fed river, with steady flow and cool temperatures, supports a healthy population of rainbow trout. Trout fishing is generally good along the main stem of the South Fork as well as on Elk Creek, a tributary, and Last Chance Creek, a tributary of Elk Creek.

The South Fork Campground, along the creek  from Unity, has 12 sites for tents or trailers and 2 sites for tents only. The campground is along Forest Road 6005 near the confluence of Rail Gulch and the South Fork. Amenities include vault toilets and picnic tables.

Amenities include picnic tables and toilets.

It has 10 campsites along Forest Road 6005 near the confluence of Elk Creek with the South Fork. Amenities include vault toilets and  picnic sites.

The south end of the South Fork OHV trail is near South Fork Campground. The trail system extends north toward Sumpter.

Tributaries
Listed from source to mouth, the named tributaries of the South Fork Burnt River are Lookout Creek, which enters from the left; Bear Creek, right; Spring and Elk creeks and Rail Gulch, left; Stevens, Barney, and Amelia creeks, right; Steep Creek, left; Bullrun Creek, right, and Pole Creek and Powell Gulch, both from the left.

See also
 List of rivers of Oregon

References

Rivers of Oregon
Rivers of Baker County, Oregon